A Canção da Primavera is a 1923 Brazilian silent romantic drama film directed by Igino Bonfioli and Cyprien Segur.

The film premiered in Rio de Janeiro on 24 July 1923.

Plot
The film is set in Minas Gerais in the 19th century, as it the story of a powerful farmer Luiz Roldão (Castro Vianna) who attempts to force a marriage between his son Jorge (Odilardo Costa) and Rosita, from the Bento's family, to unite their families for economic reasons. However, Jorge falls in loves with Lina (Iracema Aleixo).

Cast
Ari de Castro Viana as Luiz Roldão 
Odilardo Costa as Jorge 
Iracema Aleixo as Lina 
Naná Andrade as Lili 
Lucinda Barreto as Rosita 
Osiris Colombo as Padre Belisário 
Clementino Dotti as Dr. Carlos 
Alberto Gomes as Juca Barbeiro 
Nina Gomes as Salustiana

External links
 

1923 romantic drama films
1923 films
Brazilian black-and-white films
Brazilian silent feature films
Brazilian romantic drama films
Silent romantic drama films